Oronike Odeleye (born 1979/1980) is an American arts consultant and activist based in Atlanta, Georgia. She is best known as the co-creator of the #MuteRKelly movement.

Life and career
Odeleye was born in Washington, D.C. and raised in Atlanta, Georgia. Her father, an African-American sculptor, spent time in Nigeria after completing college and selected her first name from a list bestowed upon him by a Nigerian elder. She received her bachelor's degree in film studies from Syracuse University. Odeleye is an Atlanta-based arts and entertainment consultant.

In 2017, after allegations that singer R. Kelly was maintaining a sex cult involving young black women, Odeleye created a petition to ban Kelly's music from Atlanta radio stations. Soon after, Kenyette Tisha Barnes reached out to Odeleye to invite her to collaborate on the creation of a grassroots digital campaign to boycott his music, which became #MuteRKelly. Odeleye also appeared in the 2019 documentary series Surviving R. Kelly to discuss the campaign.

Accolades
 The Root 100, The Root (2019)
 Activist Impact Award, Breakthrough Inspiration Awards (2019)
 Visionary Award, Resilience (2019)
OkayAfrica's 100 Women, OkayAfrica (2019)

References

External links 
Oronike Odoleye on Twitter

Year of birth missing (living people)
Living people
African-American activists
African-American women in business
People from Atlanta
Syracuse University alumni
21st-century African-American people
21st-century African-American women